Kontoyiannis is a Greek surname. Notable people with the surname include:

Dimitrios Kontoyiannis (born 1963), Greek–American physician
Ioannis Kontoyiannis (born 1972), Greek mathematician and information theorist

Greek-language surnames